Dzafič or Džafić is a surname. Notable people with the surname include:

Adin Džafić (born 1989), Bosnian footballer
Asmir Džafić (born 1970), Bosnian footballer
Elvis Džafić (born 1990), Slovenian footballer
Emir Dzafič (born 1972), Slovenian footballer